William Clarke (born 11 April 1985) is an Australian professional road racing cyclist, who most recently rode for UCI WorldTeam . He is not related to fellow Australian cyclist and past teammate Simon Clarke. William Clarke is a descendant of Australian politician and businessman William John Turner Clarke.

Career
Clarke was born, raised, and resides on his family's  farm near Campbell Town, Tasmania, Australia.

Clarke then moved to the  team in 2014, as the team moved up to the Professional Continental level.

In May 2019, he was named in the startlist for the 2019 Giro d'Italia.

Major results

2008
 1st Goulburn to Sydney Classic
2009
 5th Time trial, Oceania Road Championships
2010
 3rd Overall Tour de Taiwan
 4th Time trial, National Road Championships
2012
 1st Stage 2 Tour Down Under
 1st Prologue Tour of Japan
 5th Road race, National Road Championships
 8th Rund um Köln
2014
 Tour of Iran
1st  Points classification
1st Stage 2
 1st Stage 1 (ITT) Tour of Japan
 1st Prologue Tour de Kumano
 2nd  Time trial, Oceania Road Championships
 5th Time trial, National Road Championships
 10th Overall Herald Sun Tour
2015
 1st Prologue Herald Sun Tour
2016
 Tour de Taiwan
1st Stages 1 & 4
 1st Stage 3 Volta a Portugal
 1st Prologue Herald Sun Tour
 1st Prologue Tour of Austria

Grand Tour general classification results timeline

References

External links

Will Clarke at 

1985 births
Living people
Australian male cyclists
Cyclists from Tasmania
Tour of Azerbaijan (Iran) winners